John Hastings, 2nd Baron Hastings (29 September 1287 – 20 January 1325) was a medieval English Baron. He was Lord of the Manor of Hunningham.

Descent 

Hastings was the son of John Hastings, 1st Baron Hastings, also inheriting the title Baron Abergavenny from his father, and the grandson of Henry de Hastings, 1st Baron Hastings. His mother was Isabel, daughter of William de Valence, 1st Earl of Pembroke.

Military career 

He served in the First War of Scottish Independence under King Edward II and was also Governor of Kenilworth Castle.

Succession 

Lord Hastings died in January 1325, aged 37. He was survived by his widow Juliana de Leybourne and was succeeded in the Barony by his son Laurence, who was created Earl of Pembroke in 1339.

References

Kidd, Charles, Williamson, David (editors). Debrett's Peerage and Baronetage (1990 edition). New York: St Martin's Press, 1990.

Hastings, John Hastings, 2nd Baron
Hastings, John Hastings, 2nd Baron
Anglo-Normans in Wales
Norman warriors
People of the Wars of Scottish Independence
John Hastings, 2nd Baron Hastings
13th-century English people
14th-century English people
Barons Hastings